The World Cup and European Championship, are the primary competitive tournaments the Italy national football team enters. The tournaments are held every four years in alternate even numbered years. Excluding the tournament years in which Italy either did not enter or failed to qualify for the finals, the Italy national team has nominated the following squads of players to compete in the tournaments:

1934 World Cup

 Progress: Winners
Head coach: Vittorio Pozzo

1938 World Cup

 Progress: Winners
Head coach: Vittorio Pozzo

1950 World Cup

 Progress: Group stage
Head coach: Ferruccio Novo

1954 World Cup

 Progress: Group stage
Head coach:  Lajos Czeizler

1962 World Cup

 Progress: Group stage
Head coach: Paolo Mazza and Giovanni Ferrari

1966 World Cup

 Progress: Group stage
Head coach: Edmondo Fabbri

1968 European Championship

 Progress: Winners
Head coach: Ferruccio Valcareggi

1970 World Cup

 Progress: Runners-up
Head coach: Ferruccio Valcareggi

1974 World Cup

 Progress: Group stage
Head coach: Ferruccio Valcareggi

1978 World Cup

 Progress: Fourth place
Head coach: Enzo Bearzot

1980 European Championship

 Progress: Fourth place
Head coach: Enzo Bearzot

1982 World Cup

 Progress: Winners
Head coach: Enzo Bearzot

1986 World Cup

 Progress: Round of 16
Head coach: Enzo Bearzot

1988 European Championship

 Progress: Semi final
Head coach: Azeglio Vicini

1990 World Cup

 Progress: Third place
Head coach: Azeglio Vicini

1994 World Cup

 Progress: Runners-up
Head coach: Arrigo Sacchi

1996 European Championship

 Progress: Group stage
Head coach: Arrigo Sacchi

1998 World Cup

 Progress: Quarter final
Head coach: Cesare Maldini

2000 European Championship
Italy named an initial 26-man squad for the tournament on 18 May 2000. Midfielders Dino Baggio and Diego Fuser, and defender Giuseppe Pancaro did not make the cut for the final 22, while forward Christian Vieri was ruled out through injury. Goalkeeper Gianluigi Buffon was originally named in the final 22, but suffered a broken hand in a warm-up friendly against Norway on 3 June 2000; he was replaced in the squad by Milan's Christian Abbiati.

 Progress: Runners-up
Head coach: Dino Zoff

2002 World Cup

Roberto Baggio was controversially excluded from the squad by coach Giovanni Trapattoni, who believed him to not have fully recovered from the serious injury he had sustained during the season although he was initially keen to include Baggio in the final 23-man list.
 Progress: Round of 16
Head coach: Giovanni Trapattoni

2004 European Championship

 Progress: Group stage
Head coach: Giovanni Trapattoni

2006 World Cup
In honour of Italy winning the FIFA World Cup for a fourth time, all members of the World Cup-winning squad were awarded the Italian Order of Merit of Cavaliere Ufficiale.

 Progress: Winners
Head coach: Marcello Lippi

2008 European Championship
Fabio Cannavaro was ruled out of the Italian squad on 2 June after he was injured in training; he was replaced by Alessandro Gamberini.

 Progress: Quarter final
Head coach: Roberto Donadoni

2010 World Cup

 Progress: Group stage
Coach: Marcello Lippi

2012 European Championship
Cesare Prandelli named a provisional 32-man squad on 13 May 2012, the final day of the 2011–12 Serie A season. On 29 May 2012, Prandelli announced his final squad list, with defender Domenico Criscito not considered due to match-fixing charges.

 Progress: Runners-up
Coach: Cesare Prandelli

2014 World Cup
The final squad was announced on 1 June 2014. The squad numbers were revealed the next day.

 Progress: Group stage
Coach: Cesare Prandelli

2016 European Championship
Antonio Conte announced his final squad on 31 May 2016, with Andrea Pirlo and Sebastian Giovinco controversially left out and Claudio Marchisio and Marco Verratti left out due to injury.

 Progress: Quarter final

Coach: Antonio Conte

2020 European Championship
Due to the COVID-19 pandemic, the tournament was played in 2021. Roberto Mancini announced his final squad on 1 June 2021. On 3 June, the injured Stefano Sensi was replaced by Matteo Pessina. On 10 June, the injured Lorenzo Pellegrini was replaced by Gaetano Castrovilli.

 Progress: Winners

Coach: Roberto Mancini

See also
 List of Italy international footballers

References

squads
squads